Tryptase beta-2, also known as tryptase II, is a proteolytic enzyme that in humans is encoded by the TPSB2 gene.

Formerly, the enzyme was known as Tryptase Clara.

Function 

Tryptases comprise a family of trypsin-like serine proteases, the peptidase family S1. Tryptases are enzymatically active only as heparin-stabilized tetramers, and they are resistant to all known endogenous proteinase inhibitors.

Several tryptase genes are clustered on chromosome 16p13.3. These genes are characterized by several distinct features. They have a highly conserved 3'-UTR and contain tandem repeat sequences at the 5' flank and 3' UTR which are thought to play a role in regulation of the mRNA stability. These genes have an intron immediately upstream of the initiator Met codon, which separates the site of transcription initiation from protein coding sequence. This feature is characteristic of tryptases but is unusual in other genes. The alleles of this gene exhibit an unusual amount of sequence variation, such that the alleles were once thought to represent two separate genes, beta II and beta III.

Beta tryptases appear to be the main isoenzymes expressed in mast cells and club cells, whereas in basophils, alpha-tryptases predominate.

Tryptases have been implicated as mediators in the pathogenesis of asthma and other allergic and inflammatory disorders. In particular, influenza A virus is activated by TPSB2-mediated proteolytic cleavage in the upper respiratory tract.

References

Further reading 

 
 
 
 
 
 
 
 
 
 
 
 
 
 
 
 

EC 3.4.21